The 1925 Norwegian Football Cup was the 24th season of the Norwegian annual knockout football tournament. The tournament was open for all members of NFF, except those from Northern Norway. Brann won their second title, having beaten Sarpsborg in the final. Odd were the defending champions, but were eliminated by Ørn in the quarterfinal.

First round

|-
|colspan="3" style="background-color:#97DEFF"|Replay

|}

Second round

|}

Third round

|-
|colspan="3" style="background-color:#97DEFF"|Replay

|-
|colspan="3" style="background-color:#97DEFF"|2nd replay

|}

Fourth round

|}

Quarter-finals

|}

Semi-finals

|}

Final

See also
1925 in Norwegian football

References

Norwegian Football Cup seasons
Norway
Football Cup